Dmitriy Kovtsun (born September 29, 1955 in Mukhivka, Ukrainian SSR) is a former discus thrower from Ukraine, who represented the Unified Team at the 1992 Summer Olympics in Barcelona, Spain. There he finished in seventh place.

References
1992 Year Ranking

1955 births
Living people
Ukrainian male discus throwers
Russian male discus throwers
Athletes (track and field) at the 1992 Summer Olympics
Olympic athletes of the Unified Team
Goodwill Games medalists in athletics
Place of birth missing (living people)
Competitors at the 1986 Goodwill Games